The Cyperaceae are a family of  graminoid (grass-like), monocotyledonous flowering plants known as sedges. The family is large, with some 5,500 known species described in about 90 genera, the largest being the "true sedges" genus Carex with over 2,000 species.

These species are widely distributed, with the centers of diversity for the group occurring in tropical Asia and tropical South America. While sedges may be found growing in almost all environments, many are associated with wetlands, or with poor soils. Ecological communities dominated by sedges are known as sedgelands or sedge meadows.

Some species superficially resemble the closely related rushes and the more distantly related grasses. Features distinguishing members of the sedge family from grasses or rushes are stems with triangular cross-sections (with occasional exceptions, a notable example being the tule which has a round cross-section) and leaves that are spirally arranged in three ranks. In comparison, grasses have alternate leaves, forming two ranks.

Some well-known sedges include the water chestnut (Eleocharis dulcis) and the papyrus sedge (Cyperus papyrus), from which the writing material papyrus was made. This family also includes cotton-grass (Eriophorum), spike-rush (Eleocharis), sawgrass (Cladium), nutsedge or nutgrass (Cyperus rotundus, a common lawn weed), and white star sedge (Rhynchospora colorata).

Genera
, 88 genera are accepted in Kew's Plants of the World Online:

References

External links
Cyperaceae at the Angiosperm Phylogeny Website

 
Poales families